Rosdorf is a municipality in the district of Göttingen, in Lower Saxony, Germany. approx. 4 km southwest of Göttingen.

Mayors
Sören Steinberg (SPD) was elected the new mayor in May 2014, and re-elected in 2021. He is the successor of Harald Grahovac (SPD) who was 18 years in office.
 Before the election, Sören Steinberg was the office manager of Thomas Oppermann.

References

Göttingen (district)